

The Light That Guides You Home is the second album by Jim Cuddy. It was released on September 12, 2006.

Track listing
All songs written by Jim Cuddy.
"The Light That Guides You Home" – 5:32
"Maybe Sometime" – 4:06
"All I Need" – 4:23
"Married Again" – 4:33
"Pull Me Through" – 5:01
"She Gets Down" – 3:12
"Countrywide Soul" – 4:47
"Will I Be Waiting" – 4:54
"One Fine Day" – 4:21
"Falling" – 3:58
"What She Said" – 4:32
"Stagger In" – 5:49

Credits 
 Songwriter: Jim Cuddy
 Publishing: Buried Crow Music
 Producer: Jim Cuddy and Colin Cripps
 Associate Producer: Chris Shreenan-Dyck
 Engineer: Chris Shreenan-Dyck
 Mixer: Chris Shreenan-Dyck with Colin Cripps & Jim Cuddy except "Country Wide Soul," "All I Need" & "Stagger In" by Darryl Neudorf with Colin Cripps & Jim Cuddy

Certifications

References

External links 
 Jim Cuddy The Official Online Music Community discography
 

2006 albums
Jim Cuddy albums
Juno Award for Adult Alternative Album of the Year albums